Nell Leyshon is a British writer whose work alternates between prose, stage and radio drama. She was born and grew up in Somerset, and spent half of her childhood in Glastonbury, and the other half in a small farming village on the edge of the Somerset Levels. She had a mixed education, and ended up attending art college for a year before moving to London. A first career culminated in working as a Production Assistant then Producer in TV commercials for directors including Ridley and Tony Scott. She gave it up to spend a year in Spain with her boyfriend Dominic, who remains her partner. She returned pregnant. She attended the University of Southampton as a mature student. Only after the birth of her second son in 1995 she started to write seriously.

Having taught adult students wanting to return to education when her children where young, she later decided to use her teaching skills to work with marginalised communities, including recovering addicts, mental health service users, gypsies and, in Labrador, aboriginal peoples. She taught and mentored creative writing and performance, focusing on developing skills and self-esteem, and, always, the writer's own original voice. In 2018 she founded The Outsiders Project a company giving voice to the unheard.

She spent 3 years on the Management Committee for the Society of Authors, and is on the Advisory Board of the Alpine Fellowship. In 2018 she became a trustee of Shakespeare's Globe Theatre, and is now Deputy Chair underneath Margaret Caseley-Hayford.

Literary work

Prose 
In May 2004, her first novel, Black Dirt, was published by Picador and was long-listed for the Orange Prize and runner up for the Commonwealth Prize.

in May 2012, her third novel, The Colour of Milk, was published by Penguin. It was translated to multiple languages, winning the Prix Interallié in France where it was also shortlisted for the Prix Femina, and voted the book of the year in Spain. In 2015 her most recent novel, Memoirs of a Dipper, was published.

Radio dramas 
Her first radio play, Milk, won the Richard Imison Award. Her second drama War Bride was runner up for the Meyer Whitworth Award.

Subsequent radio plays include Glass Eels, Soldier Boy, Writing The Century and Jess, a Woman's Hour drama about child mental health for Children in Need.

Theatre 
In 2005 her play, Comfort me with Apples, won an Evening Standard Theatre Award for most promising playwright, was nominated for a Laurence Olivier Award and was shortlisted for Susan Smith Blackburn Award

She adapted Daphne du Maurier's Don't Look Now for the Lyceum, Sheffield which later transferred to the Lyric, Hammersmith. In 2010 her play Bedlam was the first written by a woman to be performed at Shakespeare's Globe.

She has also written plays for young people for National Theatre Connections, The Beauty Manifesto and Terra which was a dance theatre piece with choreography by Anthony Missem. She also wrote for Royal Theatre Plymouth and the play, The Word, for RADA Elders group.

Other projects 
In 2014 Leyshon wrote her first libretto, The River Keeper, for Streetwise Opera, a charity which works with homeless people.

In 2018 she performed her one-woman show, Three Letters, at the Royal Shakespeare Company, then at Edinburgh Fringe where it was broadcast on BBC Radio 3.

The Outsiders Project 
In 2018 Leyshon founded The Outsiders Project, a company that gives voice to the unheard and marginalised through working with outsider artists and supporting their creativity. They work with members of the community of Boscombe, and the work is shown locally then shared with a wider world. The work is designed to develop authentic voices and is of exceptional quality.

Their vision is to show that people sidelined from society can write, perform and create work at the highest level. They support the outsider community to push boundaries to prove they can create work of outstanding quality and worth.

The Outsiders Project has produced three works for the stage; Vodka Hunters, Secret Voices  and The Truth About Men, all three as part of BEAF – Bournemouth Emerging Arts Fringe Festival 2018 and 2019.

During the 2020 COVID-19 pandemic they launched the Tattoo Project an online initiative to gather, tell stories and find new outsider artists.

Teaching 
Leyshon has been teaching for 27 years, but spent the last 17 years specialising in outsider voices. She has worked extensively with the recovery community in prisons and mental health settings. She has also worked with the Gypsy community, and has led many partnership courses for Arvon Foundation.

She has started The Lockdown Workshops a series of workshops to share her approach to writing during the lockdown.

Selected work

Novels 

Black Dirt, (Picador, 2004)
Devotion (Picador, 2008)
The Colour of Milk, (Penguin, 2012)
Memoirs of a Dipper (Penguin, 2015)

Radio Dramas 

The Farm (2002) (BBC Radio 4)
Milk (2002) (BBC Radio 4)
Glass Eels (2003) (BBC Radio 4)
The Home Field (2003) (BBC Radio 3)
The House in the Trees (2004) (BBC Radio 4)
Soldier Boy (2005) (BBC Radio 4)
Black Dirt (BBC Radio 3)
War Bride (2008) (BBC Radio 4)
Sons  (2009) (BBC Radio 4)
The Iron Curtain (2011) (BBC Radio 4, Woman's Hour)
The Colour of Milk (2013) (BBC Radio 4)
Jess's Story, Children in need, BBC Radio 4
Three Letters (BBC Radio 3)

Theatre 

 The Farm
Milk
Comfort me with Apples Hampstead Theatre
Don't Look Now (adapted from the story by Daphne du Maurier), Lyric Theatre (Hammersmith)
 The Beauty Manifesto
 The River Keeper Streetwise Opera
 Glass Eels
 Bedlam, Shakespeare's Globe
 Winter, Theatre Newfoundland and Labrador
 The Word, RADA Elders group
 Barro, Gran Teatro Nacional Peru
 Terra, National Theatre Connections
 Three Letters, Royal Shakespeare Company

Personal life 
Nell lives in Dorset with her partner Dominic. She has two sons.

References

External links 
 Nell Leyshon Official Website

English dramatists and playwrights
Alumni of the University of Southampton
Living people
Year of birth missing (living people)